Alexirrhoe or Alexiroe (Ancient Greek: Ἀλεξιῥῤόη) is a name in Greek mythology that may refer to following women:

Alexirrhoe, a naiad daughter of the river-god Granicus. She secretly bore Aesacus to King Priam of Troy on the 'shady ridges of Mt. Ida' . Otherwise, the mother of Aesacus was called Arisbe, daughter of King Merops of Percote.
Alexirrhoe, mother of Carmanor by Dionysus.

Notes

References 

 Apollodorus, The Library with an English Translation by Sir James George Frazer, F.B.A., F.R.S. in 2 Volumes, Cambridge, MA, Harvard University Press; London, William Heinemann Ltd. 1921. ISBN 0-674-99135-4. Online version at the Perseus Digital Library. Greek text available from the same website.
 Lucius Mestrius Plutarchus, Morals translated from the Greek by several hands. Corrected and revised by. William W. Goodwin, PH. D. Boston. Little, Brown, and Company. Cambridge. Press Of John Wilson and son. 1874. 5. Online version at the Perseus Digital Library.
 Publius Ovidius Naso, Metamorphoses translated by Brookes More (1859-1942). Boston, Cornhill Publishing Co. 1922. Online version at the Perseus Digital Library.
 Publius Ovidius Naso, Metamorphoses. Hugo Magnus. Gotha (Germany). Friedr. Andr. Perthes. 1892. Latin text available at the Perseus Digital Library.

Naiads
Nymphs
Consorts of Dionysus